Maria João Koehler and Katalin Marosi were the defending champions, but Marosi chose not to participate. Koehler partnered up with Marta Sirotkina, but they lost in the semifinals to Vesna Dolonc and Stefanie Vögele.

Vesna Dolonc and Stefanie Vögele won the title, defeating Karolína Plíšková and Kristýna Plíšková in the final, 6–1, 6–7(3–7), [15–13].

Seeds

Draw

Draw

References
 Main Draw

Aegon GB Pro-Series Shrewsbury - Doubles